Thomas Morgan Joseph-Watkin (1856–1915) was a barrister and long-serving officer of arms at the College of Arms in London. Having spent much of his early life as a cowboy in Texas, Joseph-Watkin began his career at the College of Arms as Portcullis Pursuivant of Arms in Ordinary in April 1894. On 20 June 1913, Joseph-Watkin was appointed Chester Herald of Arms in Ordinary to replace Henry Murray Lane.  This appointment lasted until Joseph-Watkin's death on 31 July 1915.

See also
Heraldry
Pursuivant
Herald

References

The College of Arms
CUHAGS Officer of Arms Index
His armorial shield

1856 births
1915 deaths
English genealogists
English officers of arms